Windsor High School may refer to:

Australia 

South Africa 
Windsor High School (Cape Town)

United Kingdom
Windsor High School, Halesowen, England

United States
Windsor High School (California)
Windsor High School (Colorado)
Windsor High School (Connecticut)
Windsor High School (Imperial, Missouri)
Windsor High School (Vermont)
Windsor High School (Virginia)

See also
West Windsor-Plainsboro High School North in Plainsboro Township, New Jersey, United States
West Windsor-Plainsboro High School South in Princeton Junction, New Jersey, United States